Billy Crook may refer to:

 Billy Crook (English footballer) (1926–2011), English footballer who played over 200 times for Wolverhampton Wanderers
 Billy Crook (American soccer) (born 1964), U.S. football (soccer) international

See also
William Crook (disambiguation)